Carlos Arancibia (16 July 1911 – 17 March 1987) was a Chilean footballer. He played in three matches for the Chile national football team in 1942. He was also part of Chile's squad for the 1942 South American Championship.

References

External links
 

1911 births
1987 deaths
Chilean footballers
Chile international footballers
Place of birth missing
Association football forwards
Club de Deportes Green Cross footballers